The Palace of Antonio de Mendoza (Spanish: Palacio de Antonio de Mendoza) is a palace located in Guadalajara, Spain. It was declared Bien de Interés Cultural in 1931.

References 

Bien de Interés Cultural landmarks in the Province of Guadalajara
Buildings and structures in Guadalajara, Spain
Palaces in Castilla–La Mancha